Never Buy Texas from a Cowboy, released on Atlantic Records in November 1979, was the second album from the American female funk band, The Brides of Funkenstein. Morphing into a trio on the second album release, the vocalists consisted of Dawn Silva, Sheila Horne, and Jeanette McGruder. Horne and McGruder served as background vocalists on subsequent P-Funk concert tours.
  
Never Buy Texas From a Cowboy would be granted a Cashbox Rhythm & Blues Award in 1980 for 'Best Female Group'. The song slated for the award was the 1979 single "Didn't Mean To Fall In Love", written and produced by Ron Dunbar. The album's top single release, "Never Buy Texas From a Cowboy" became a hit in the Midwest, Europe and Asia. "Never Buy Texas from A Cowboy" resurfaced in 2001 with Rolling Stone rating this album as the top 50 coolest albums of all times.

Never Buy Texas From A Cowboy was produced by George Clinton except for "Smoke Signals", which was produced by Clinton and Bootsy Collins, and "Didn't Mean To Fall In Love", which was produced by Ron Dunbar. The album was later reissued in the U.S. by the Wounded Bird label on October 18, 2011.

Track listing
"Never Buy Texas from a Cowboy" (George Clinton, Ron Dunbar) (released as a single - Atlantic 3640) 15:15
"I'm Holding You Responsible" (George Clinton, Eddie Hazel) 5:30
"Smoke Signals" (George Clinton, Bootsy Collins) 6:40
"Mother May I" (Garry Shider, Tracey Lewis, Jim Vitti) 5:35
"Party Up In Here" (George Clinton, Rodney Curtis) (released as a 12" single - Atlantic PR 354) 5:33
"Didn't Mean to Fall in Love" (Ron Dunbar, Pete Bishop) (released as a single - Atlantic 3658) 4:00

Personnel
Dawn Silva, Sheila Horne, Jeanette McGruder - vocals
Bernie Worrell, Gary Hudgins, Ernesto Wilson, Jerome Rogers, Rudy Robinson - keyboards
Bootsy Collins, Jeff Bunn, Rodney Curtis, Donnie Sterling, Bruce Nazarian - bass
Garry Shider, Michael Hampton, DeWayne "Blackbyrd" McKnight, Bruce Nazarian, Bootsy Collins, Eddie Hazel, Rodney Crutcher - guitar
Bootsy Collins, Dennis Chambers, Kenny Colton, Jerry Jones - drums
Larry Fratangelo, Carl Small - percussion
Jessica Cleaves, Ray Davis, Mallia Franklin, George Clinton, Tracey Lewis - additional vocals

References

The Brides of Funkenstein albums
1979 albums
Atlantic Records albums